WIRB (1490 AM) is a radio station licensed to serve Level Plains, Alabama, United States, a suburb of Dothan, Alabama. The station is owned by Fabiola Lev and Arik Lev, G.P.

Co-Licensee Fabiola Lev is the former wife of Arik Lev, with the divorce finalized in May 2019.. According to the license transfer application, Fabiola is 80% owner of the general partnership that purchased the license for $5,000

As of July 2019, the FCC has not been informed of any change in the ownership structure. Arik Lev stated on the application that he is a citizen of Israel. Non-citizen ownership of American radio licenses is limited to 20%, so he was in compliance with section 310(B) of the FCC rules.

While the FCC approved the license transfer in December 2018, the actual transfer was not completed until June 20, 2019.

Programming
Digital 1490 WIRB broadcasts a classic soul/R&B, talk and sports format.

History
This station received its original license from the Federal Communications Commission (FCC) on December 11, 2006.

Unrelated licenses
This WIRB is unrelated to the WIRB formerly licensed to Enterprise that broadcast at 600 kHz from 1948 to 1988. That station changed its call letters to WLHQ on May 11, 1988, before going off the air for good. It was deleted from the FCC database on May 13, 1992.

This radio station is also unrelated to the television station in Melbourne, Florida, that used the WIRB callsign from May 1, 1992, until February 13, 1998, when it became WOPX.

In October 2020 WIRB changed their format to classic soul/R&B, talk and sports, branded as "Digital 1490".

References

External links
digital1490.com - Official Website

IRB
Radio stations established in 2006
Dale County, Alabama